Carbon Hill is a village in Grundy County, Illinois, United States. The population was 372 at the 2020 census.

Geography
Carbon Hill is located at  (41.296317, -88.299524).

Demographics

As of the census of 2000, there were 392 people, 149 households, and 109 families residing in the village. The racial makeup of the village was 98.21% White, 1.79% from other races. Hispanic or Latino of any race were 2.55% of the population.

There were 149 households, out of which 32.9% had children under the age of 18 living with them, 58.4% were married couples living together, 9.4% had a female householder with no husband present, and 26.2% were non-families. 19.5% of all households were made up of individuals, and 5.4% had someone living alone who was 65 years of age or older.  The average household size was 2.63 and the average family size was 2.99.

In the village, the population was spread out, with 24.5% under the age of 18, 10.2% from 18 to 24, 32.1% from 25 to 44, 23.2% from 45 to 64, and 9.9% who were 65 years of age or older.  The median age was 35 years. For every 100 females, there were 94.1 males.  For every 100 females age 18 and over, there were 92.2 males.

The median income for a household in the village was $53,750, and the median income for a family was $56,875. Males had a median income of $38,000 versus $30,000 for females. The per capita income for the village was $22,228.  About 1.9% of families and 3.0% of the population were below the poverty line, including none of those under the age of eighteen or sixty-five or over.

References

Villages in Grundy County, Illinois
Villages in Illinois